Watkins House may refer to:

United States

Tom Watkins House, Searcy, Arkansas, listed on the National Register of Historic Places (NRHP) in White County
Watkins House (Searcy, Arkansas), NRHP-listed in White County
Watkins-Cartan House, Atherton, California, NRHP-listed in San Mateo County, also known as Commodore James Watkins House
Dunn-Watkins House, Lancaster, Kentucky, NRHP-listed in Kentucky
Thomas B. Watkins House, Lexington, Kentucky, NRHP-listed in Kentucky
Watkins House (Minden, Louisiana), NRHP-listed in Louisiana
Watkins House and Cabins, South Casco, Maine, NRHP-listed
Watkins Point Farm, Marion Station, Maryland, NRHP-listed
Watkins Manor House, Winona, Minnesota, NRHP-listed
W. W. Watkins House, Aberdeen, Mississippi, NRHP-listed in Mississippi
Watkins House (Richmond, Missouri), NRHP-listed
Watkins Family Farm Historic District, Raymore, Missouri, NRHP-listed
Albert Watkins House, Lincoln, Nebraska, NRHP-listed in Nebraska
Mason-Watkins House, Surry, New Hampshire, NRHP-listed
Watkins House (Centerville, Ohio), NRHP-listed in Ohio
J. F. Watkins House, Portland, Oregon, NRHP-listed
Frances Ellen Watkins, House, Philadelphia, Pennsylvania, NRHP-listed in Pennsylvania
William Watkins House, Mt. Pleasant, Tennessee, NRHP-listed
Watkins-Witt House, Talbott, Tennessee, NRHP-listed in Tennessee
Kesterson-Watkins House, Tazewell, Tennessee, NRHP-listed in Tennessee
William L. and Mary Watkins House, Brigham City, Utah, NRHP-listed
Watkins-Coleman House, Midway, Utah, NRHP-listed
John and Margaret Watkins House, Midway, Utah, NRHP-listed in Utah
Watkins-Tholman-Larsen Farmstead, Mt. Pleasant, Utah, NRHP-listed in Utah
Watkins House (Keysville, Virginia), NRHP-listed
Watkins Ferry Toll House, Martinsburg, West Virginia, NRHP-listed